1st Lieutenant Henry "Hank" Hughes IV is an American film director and former Paratrooper for 173rd Airborne Brigade Combat Team. He is best known for directing and co-writing the short-film Day One as a part of his graduate project at American Film Institute.

Day one received critical appraisal and earned him a Best Narrative (short) Gold Medal at 42nd Annual Student Film Awards, BAFTA US Student Award at 2016 BAFTA/LA Student Film Awards, and Academy Award for Best Live Action Short Film nomination at 88th Academy Awards. He is a graduate of Boston University.

Filmography

Awards

 Academy Award for Best Live Action Short Film - nominated 
 Academy of Television Arts and Sciences Award for Best Directing - Short - won
 Best Narrative (short) Gold Medal - won
 BAFTA US Student Award - won
 Stony Brook Film Festival for Best Short - Jury - won

References

External links
 
 

Living people
American film directors
American film producers
Year of birth missing (living people)